The 1985 Winfield Australian Masters was a professional non-ranking snooker tournament that took place in August 1985 at the Parmatta Club in Sydney, Australia.

Tony Meo won the tournament by defeating John Campbell 7–2 in the final.

Main draw

References

Australian Goldfields Open
1985 in Australian sport
1985 in snooker